Mariño is a Galician surname.  This family name is spelled Marinho in Portuguese. Notable people with the surname include:

Diego Mariño (born 1990), Spanish soccer player
Pedro Mariño de Lobera, Spanish conquistador and author
Francisco Mariño y Soler, Aristocrat / Lieutenant Colonel of Colombia Army / Counselor of War / Brigadier General in Retirement
Santiago Mariño, Venezuelan General and Independence war hero
Juan Carlos Mariño, Peruvian footballer
María Mariño, Spanish author of Galician origin

See also
Marinho Chagas, real name Francisco das Chagas Marinho, former Brazilian football player

Galician-language surnames